Key House Mirror is a 2015 Danish drama film directed by Michael Noer.

Cast 
 Ghita Nørby - Lily
 Sven Wollter - Piloten, Erik
 Trine Pallesen - Katrine
  - Tove
  - Max

References

External links 

Danish drama films
2015 drama films
2015 films
2010s Danish-language films
Films directed by Michael Noer
Films about old age